Acrochaetium is a genus of marine red alga.

 Names brought to synonymy
Acrochaetium elegans (K.M.Drew) Papenfuss 1945 is a synonym of Colaconema elegans (K.M.Drew) I.-K.Hwang & H.-S.Kim.

References 

 Woelkerling, W.J. (1983). The Audouinella (Acrochaetium-Rhodochorton) complex (Rhodophyta): present perspectives. Phycologia 22: 59–92, 22 figs, 10 tables
 Harper, J.T. & Saunders, G.W. (2002). A re-classification of the Acrochaetiales based on molecular and morphological data, and establishment of the Colaconematales, ord. nov.. British Phycological Journal 37: 463-475
 Recherches sur les genres Acrochaetium Naeg. et Rhodochorton Naeg., 1927. (Gontran Hamel's doctoral thesis)

External links 
 
  
 Acrochaetium at AlgaeBase

Acrochaetiales
Red algae genera